German submarine U-981 was a Type VIIC U-boat of Nazi Germany's Kriegsmarine during World War II.

She was ordered on 5 June 1941, and was laid down on 24 August 1942 at Blohm & Voss, Hamburg, as yard number 181. She was launched on 29 April 1943 and commissioned under the command of Oberleutnant zur See Walter Sitek on 3 June 1943.

Design
German Type VIIC submarines were preceded by the shorter Type VIIB submarines. U-981 had a displacement of  when at the surface and  while submerged. She had two shafts and two  propellers.

U-981 was fitted with five  torpedo tubes (four fitted at the bow and one at the stern), fourteen torpedoes or 26 TMA mines, one  SK C/35 naval gun, 220 rounds, and one twin  C/30 anti-aircraft gun. The boat had a complement of between 44 — 52 men.

Service history
U-981 sailed on three uneventful war patrols, sinking no ships in 87 total days at sea.

On 12 August 1944, U-981 was sunk by an air-laid mine and depth charges off of La Rochelle, France, in the Bay of Biscay. U-981 struck a mine in the British field Cinnamon and was attacked by a British Halifax of 502 Squadron/F RAF. Forty of the crew of fifty-two survived.

Wolfpacks
U-981 took part in five wolfpacks, namely:
 Coronel 1 (14 – 17 December 1943)
 Sylt (18 – 23 December 1943)
 Rügen 1 (23 – 28 December 1943)
 Rügen 2 (28 December 1943 – 7 January 1944)
 Rügen  (7 – 26 January 1944)

References

External links

Bibliography

German Type VIIC submarines
U-boats commissioned in 1943
World War II submarines of Germany
Ships built in Hamburg
1943 ships
Maritime incidents in August 1944
World War II shipwrecks in the Atlantic Ocean